is a train station in Shimanto, Kōchi Prefecture, Japan, operated by the Tosa Kuroshio Railway. It is numbered "TK39".

Lines and services

Layout
The station and track is located on an embankment. The station, which is unmanned, consists of a side platform serving a single track. There is no station building, only a shelter for waiting passengers. A parking area with vending machines and a bike shed is located at the base of the embankment off National Route 56. A flight of steps leads from this parking area to the platform and the station is thus not wheelchair accessible.

Adjacent stations

History
The station opened on 1 April 1988.

Passenger statistics
In fiscal 2011, the station was used by an average of 128 passengers daily.

Surrounding area
 National Route 56 runs parallel to the track.
 The urban area surrounding this station is named Kotsuka on maps, and is part of the town of Shimanto.

See also
 List of railway stations in Japan

References

Railway stations in Kōchi Prefecture
Railway stations in Japan opened in 1988